Monika Bohge (Lüdenscheid, 1947) is a German writer.

Biography
She studied to become a teacher of mathematics and religion and worked in several centres for people with disabilities. She has authored many spiritual chants and was a member of the band TAKT.

Works
 Ich frage mich. Strube-Verlag 1988 (Mus.: Herbert Beuerle)
 Die Geschichte von Zachäus. Strube-Verlag 1991 (Mus.: Joachim Schwarz)
 Rede nicht von deinem Glauben. 1995 (Mus.: Hartmut Reußwig)
 Du bist dabei. Strube-Verlag 2001 (Mus.: Rolf Schweizer)
 Begegnung mit dem Propheten. Strube-Verlag 2004 (Mus.: Rolf Schweizer)

External links and references
 

1947 births
Living people
German women writers
Women religious writers